Catherine A. M. Clarke is a British academic. She serves as the Chair in the History of People, Place and Community at the Institute of Historical Research, School of Advanced Study, University of London, where she is Director of the Centre for History of People, Place and Community and Director of the Victoria County History. She is a specialist in the Middle Ages and has published on power, place and identity in medieval Britain.

Education 
Clarke received her PhD in 2003 from the Department of English at King's College, London. Her doctoral thesis was titled The Locus Amoenus in Old English: Guthlac A and its Cultural Context.

Career 
Clarke taught at Swansea University and the University of Oxford, and was appointed to a personal chair at the English Department of the University of Southampton in 2012, where she remains a visiting professor. She was appointed Chair at the Institute of Historical Research, University of London, in 2019; within this role she is Director of the Victoria County History, a national project founded in 1899 to write the history of English counties.

Clarke has led major Arts and Humanities Research Council-funded projects on medieval places and their interpretation, such as "City Witness: Place and Perspective in Medieval Swansea". Her project "The St Thomas Way" developed a new heritage route from Swansea to Hereford, inspired by medieval pilgrimage.

In 2016 Clarke delivered the Denys Hay Lecture at the University of Edinburgh: 'Place machines: memory, imagination and the medieval city'. She is the Director of CARMEN: The Worldwide Medieval Network, and programme coordinator for Anglo-Saxon Studies at the annual Leeds International Medieval Congress. She previously held a Visiting Fellowship at the Lilly Library, Indiana University Bloomington.

Clarke has written for The Conversation and appeared on Channel Four historical documentaries.

Bibliography 
 The St Thomas Way and the Medieval March of Wales: Exploring Place, Heritage, Pilgrimage, edited by Catherine Clarke (ARC Humanities Press, 2020)
Medieval Cityscapes Today, edited by Catherine Clarke (ARC Humanities Press, 2019)
 Writing Power in Anglo-Saxon England: Texts, Hierarchies, Economies (Woodbridge: Boydell Press, 2012)
 Mapping the Medieval City: Space, Place and Identity in Chester c.1200–1600 (Cardiff: University of Wales Press, 2011)
 Literary Landscapes and the Idea of England, 700–1400 (Cambridge: D. S. Brewer, 2006)

References

External links 
 Profile at the Institute of Historical Research
 Profile page for the National Co-ordinating Centre for Public Engagement

British historians
Academics of the University of London
Living people
Year of birth missing (living people)
Alumni of King's College London
Contributors to the Victoria County History